Róbert Matejka (born 30 May 1996) is a Slovak football forward who currently plays for TJ Rovinka, on loan from ŠK Slovan Bratislava.

Club career

ŠK Slovan Bratislava
At the age of 17, he made his professional debut for ŠK Slovan Bratislava against FK DAC 1904 Dunajská Streda on 22 March 2014.

References

External links
ŠK Slovan Bratislava profile

Corgoň Liga profile
Eurofotbal profile

1996 births
Living people
Slovak footballers
Association football forwards
ŠK Slovan Bratislava players
FC DAC 1904 Dunajská Streda players
FC Petržalka players
Slovak Super Liga players
Footballers from Bratislava